Bayandur is a village and municipality in the Tartar Rayon of Azerbaijan.  It has a population of 596.

References 

Azerbaijan Development Gateway

Populated places in Tartar District